Nilwood is an incorporated town in Macoupin County, Illinois, United States. The population was 201 at the 2020 census, down from 284 in 2000.

Geography
Illinois Route 4 passes through the north side of town, leading southwest  to Carlinville, the county seat, and northeast  to Girard.

The town is drained to the northeast by the headwaters of Shearles Branch, which turns south and flows to Macoupin Creek, a west-flowing tributary of the Illinois River.

Demographics

As of the census of 2000, there were 284 people, 107 households, and 80 families residing in the town. The racial makeup of the town was 100.00% White. Hispanic or Latino of any race were 1.06% of the population.

There were 107 households, out of which 35.5% had children under the age of 18 living with them, 62.6% were married couples living together, 5.6% had a female householder with no husband present, and 25.2% were non-families. 19.6% of all households were made up of individuals, and 9.3% had someone living alone who was 65 years of age or older. The average household size was 2.65 and the average family size was 3.01.

In the town, the population was spread out, with 26.4% under the age of 18, 7.4% from 18 to 24, 29.2% from 25 to 44, 23.9% from 45 to 64, and 13.0% who were 65 years of age or older. The median age was 37 years. For every 100 females, there were 100.0 males. For every 100 females age 18 and over, there were 99.0 males.

The median income for a household in the town was $32,386, and the median income for a family was $34,750. Males had a median income of $27,250 versus $15,000 for females. The per capita income for the town was $12,365. About 11.7% of families and 16.7% of the population were below the poverty line, including 26.4% of those under the age of eighteen and 7.1% of those 65 or over.

References

1867 establishments in Illinois
Populated places established in 1867
Towns in Macoupin County, Illinois
Towns in Illinois